Pictionary is a charades-inspired word-guessing game invented by Robert Angel with graphic design by Gary Everson and first published in 1985 by Angel Games Inc. Angel Games licensed Pictionary to Western Publishing. Hasbro purchased the rights in 1994 after acquiring the games business of Western Publishing.  Mattel acquired ownership of Pictionary in 2001. The game is played in teams with players trying to identify specific words from their teammates.

History 
The concept of Pictionary was first created by Robert Angel and his friends in 1981. Angel and his roommates came up with the concept of the game, which proved to be very popular between them. While originally hesitant to pitch the idea, Angel was inspired by Trivial Pursuit, the gameplay of which was similar to his concept and proved to him that such gameplay could work and be successful.

Angel and his business partners Terry Langston and Gary Everson first published Pictionary in 1985 through Angel Games. A week before Pictionary was first launched, Angel Games' printing company called to inform them that they could not sort through the 500,000 cards they had printed out. Angel and his partners had to sort through the cards themselves over the course of six days. They managed to sell 6,000 copies in one year at $35 each.

Angel Games licensed the game in 1986 in a joint venture between The Games Gang and Western Publishing. In 1994, Hasbro took over publishing after acquiring the games business of Western Publishing.

In 2001, Pictionary was sold to Mattel. At that time they were in 60 countries and 45 languages, with 11 versions just in the US and a total of 32,000,000 games sold worldwide.

Objective
Each team moves a piece on a game board formed by a sequence of squares. Each square has a letter or shape identifying the type of picture to be drawn on it. The objective is to be the first team to reach the last space on the board. To achieve this a player must guess the word or phrase being drawn by their partner, or if the player lands on an "all play" square, one player from each team attempts to illustrate the same concept simultaneously, with the two teams racing to guess first. The first player to land and guess correctly at the finish wins.

Gameplay

The team chooses one person to begin drawing; this position rotates with each word. The drawer chooses a card out of a deck of special Pictionary cards and tries to draw pictures which suggest the word printed on the card. The pictures cannot contain any numbers or letters, nor can the drawers use spoken clues about the subjects they are drawing. The teammates try to guess the word the drawing is intended to represent.

There are five types of squares on the board, and each Pictionary card has a list of five words printed on it. Players must then draw the word which corresponds to the square on the board on which the team's marker is:

AP category (and a random selection of check-marked words in other categories) are designated as "All Play". For "All Play," the teams compete against each other. Each team designates a player whose purpose will be to draw pictures. The team that guesses the word first gets to advance and take the next turn. If none of the teams guess the word, the turn passes to whichever team should have been next. One may not point or gesture to an object

A one-minute timer, usually a sand timer, is used to compel players to rapidly complete their drawing and guessing.

Reception
Games included Pictionary in its top 100 games of 1986, saying, "The frequent All Play rounds, in which all teams try to identify the same word, are especially exciting. Artistic talent is not a requirement; ingeniously simple drawings almost always win. The 2,500 color-coded words provide real tests of imagination."

Reviews
Jeux & Stratégie #53

See also
 iconary, a Pictionary-like online game where you partner with an AI player
 iSketch, a Pictionary-like online game
 Pictionary (1989 game show), Pictionary (1997 game show), and Pictionary (2021 game show).  Three television shows that were based on Pictionary
 Win, Lose or Draw, a game show with a similar concept to Pictionary
 Fast Draw, a 1968 game show with a similar concept to Win, Lose or Draw and Pictionary
 Pictionary (video game), a video game based on Pictionary released for the Nintendo Entertainment System in 1990
 Draw Something, an asynchronous mobile game with a similar concept
 Charades, a game that inspired Pictionary where players act out words or phrases

References

American board games
Word board games
Guessing games
Party board games
Roll-and-move board games
Products introduced in 1985
Hasbro games
Mattel games
Western Publishing